Anna Hellman (born 29 November 1978) is a Swedish snowboarder. She was born in Gävleborg. She competed at the 1998 Winter Olympics, in halfpipe.

References

External links 
 

1978 births
Living people
Sportspeople from Gävleborg County
Swedish female snowboarders
Olympic snowboarders of Sweden
Snowboarders at the 1998 Winter Olympics
Snowboarders at the 2002 Winter Olympics
20th-century Swedish women